Gnosippus is a genus of daesiid camel spiders, first described by Ferdinand Karsch in 1880.

Species 
, the World Solifugae Catalog accepts the following four species:

 Gnosippus anatolicus Roewer, 1961 — Turkey
 Gnosippus franchettii Caporiacco, 1937 — Eritrea
 Gnosippus klunzingeri Karsch, 1880 — Egypt, Guinea-Bissau, Israel
 Gnosippus yemenensis (Simon, 1882) — Oman, Yemen

References 

Arachnid genera
Solifugae